Sir James Richard William Goss KC (born 12 May 1953), styled The Hon. Mr Justice Goss, is a judge of the High Court of England and Wales, assigned to the King's Bench Division. He was previously a Queen's Counsel, specialising in criminal law.

His most recent case is the Lucy Letby trial, which began in October 2022.

Early life and education

Goss was born on 12 May 1953 to His Honour Judge William Alan Belcher Goss, and his wife Yvonne, née Samuelson.

He was educated at Charterhouse and University College, Durham where he graduated in 1974 as a Bachelor of Arts in Law. He is now an Honorary Fellow of Durham University and patron of 'The Mr Justice Goss University College Law Prize'.

Legal career
Goss was called to the bar at Inner Temple in 1975. He was a recorder from 1994 to 2009 and was appointed Queen's Counsel in 1997.

He was appointed as a Legal Member of the Mental health tribunal in 2003, as a Legal Member of the Restricted Patients Panel in 2006 and in 2009 he was appointed a Circuit Judge on the North Eastern Circuit. In 2011 he was appointed as a Senior Circuit Judge and Honorary Recorder, Resident Judge of Newcastle-upon-Tyne.

In October 2014 Goss was appointed a judge of the High Court of Justice (Queen's Bench Division), receiving the customary appointment as a Knight Bachelor.

In September 2016, Goss was appointed a Presiding Judge on the North Eastern Circuit with effect from 1 January 2017.

In February 2017, Goss tried a case alone after dismissing the jury in a 'crash-for-cash' case due to jury tampering. This was the second time such a decision had been taken under statutory provisions introduced in 2007.

Goss presided over the trial of Carl Beech, sentencing him upon conviction to 18 years' imprisonment.

Personal life
Goss married Dawna Elizabeth Davies in 1982. They have five children: Alexandra, Prunella, George, Claudia, and William.

References

1953 births
Living people
People educated at Charterhouse School
Alumni of University College, Durham
Members of the Inner Temple
Queen's Bench Division judges
Knights Bachelor
British King's Counsel